Philip James Thomas (March 26, 1921 – January 26, 2007) was a Canadian teacher, musician and folklorist.

Military
Born in Victoria, British Columbia, Canada, Thomas entered the RCAF near the outbreak of World War II. With the Air Force, he was engaged in development of Canada’s radar technology. He saw service in Europe and India.

Teaching
After World War II on discharge from the RCAF, Thomas returned to BC.  He studied education at the University of British Columbia.  His first teaching assignment in 1949 was in Pender Harbour.  Through contact with local residents he developed an interest in folklore and storytelling through song. In 1953 he was hired by the Vancouver School Board as an art teacher. In 1964-65, he was principal of The New School, a private, progressive school in East Vancouver.

Archivist
Thomas developed his own philosophy of children’s art education that “honoured the child and how the child makes art.” In 1959 he co-founded the Vancouver Folk Song Circle (later the Vancouver Folk Song Society), which became a vehicle to collect additional material. The Song Circle is the oldest folk music society in Canada.

His 1979 book, Songs of the Pacific Northwest, is “of particular interest because it is the first sizeable collection of Canadian songs from anywhere west of Ontario”.

Music
He played both guitar and banjo, and he and his wife Hilda Thomas (1928–2005) often performed together at folk festivals in British Columbia and western Canada.

Publications
 Cariboo Wagon Road 1858-1868 (1964)
 Songs of the Pacific Northwest (1979; second revised and expanded edition, 2006)
 Twenty-Five Songs for Vancouver 1886-1986 (1985)
 "Both “Stanley G. Triggs”: A Recollection" Canadian Folklore Bulletin, 1996

Recordings
 Phil Thomas and Friends: Live at Folklife Expo 86
 Where the Fraser River Flows and other Songs of the Pacific Northwest
 The Young Man from Canada: B.C. Songs from the P.J. Thomas Collection (performed by Jon Bartlett and Rika Ruebsaat)

Honours and awards
 G.A. Ferguson Prize, from the B.C. Teachers Federation
 Honorary Life Member of the B.C. Art Teachers Association
 Honorary President and Life Member of the Canadian Society for Traditional Music
 Marius Barbeau Award

References

 Obituary

External links
  Description of the P.J. Thomas Collection of British Columbia Folk Songs
 Philip J. Thomas Popular Song Collection (searchable database)
 "Philip J. Thomas" The Canadian Encyclopedia

1921 births
2007 deaths
Musicians from Victoria, British Columbia
Canadian folk guitarists
Canadian male guitarists
Canadian folklorists
University of British Columbia Faculty of Education alumni
Royal Canadian Air Force personnel
20th-century Canadian guitarists
20th-century Canadian male musicians